Phytoecia caerulescens is a species of beetle in the family Cerambycidae. It was described by Scopoli in 1763, originally under the genus Leptura. It has a wide distribution in Europe, and has been introduced into Australia. It feeds on Echium vulgare, Lappula squarrosa, Anchusa officinalis, Lithospermum officinale, and Cynoglossum officinale.

Subspecies
 Phytoecia caerulescens cretensis Breuning, 1947
 Phytoecia caerulescens caerulescens (Scopoli, 1763)

References

Phytoecia
Beetles described in 1763
Taxa named by Giovanni Antonio Scopoli